Medicon Valley Alliance (or MVA for short) is the Danish-Swedish cluster organisation representing human life sciences in the cross-border region of Medicon Valley. As a non-profit member organisation, Medicon Valley Alliance (MVA) carries out initiatives on behalf of the local life science community in order to create new research and business opportunities – initiatives which members would not be able to implement individually, and with the aim of strengthening the development of Medicon Valley.

The organisation 
MVA's member base comprises biotech, medtech and pharma companies of all sizes, CRO's and CMO's, as well as public organizations, universities, science parks, investors, and various business service providers.

MVA is committed to facilitate economic growth, increased competitiveness and employment in Medicon Valley, and is furthermore committed to raise the international recognition of Medicon Valley with the aim of attracting labour, investments, and partners. MVA accomplish this by enhancing local networks, improving local framework conditions, increasing the visibility of Medicon Valley and facilitating international relations to companies and research institutions around the world.

There are currently +300 MVA-members including numerous big and small private biotech companies and public sector research institutions. Among the most prominent members are Novo Nordisk, Technical University of Denmark, University of Lund and University of Copenhagen

The current CEO of Medicon Valley Alliance is Anette Stenberg, following Petter Hartman and Stig Jørgensen.

Chairman of the board is CEO of Alligator Bioscience, Søren Bregenholt. Deputy chairman is Ulf G. Andersson, CEO of MEDEON.

Membership 
MVA participants comprise academic departments, regions (hospital managers), states, research, pharmaceutical and medical firms, CROs, CMOs, technology parks, developers, market service providers and other Medicon Valley organizations.

References

External links

 Oresund Science Region – Medicon Valley Alliance 

 Medicon Valley Alliance
 Life Science Ambassador Programme

Science and technology in Sweden
Biotechnology organizations
High-technology business districts
Scientific organizations based in Denmark
Business organizations based in Denmark
Business organizations based in Sweden
Organizations based in Copenhagen
Organizations established in 1997